Banner Township is a township in Saline County, Arkansas, United States. Its total population was 6,790 as of the 2010 United States Census, an increase of 22.85 percent from 5,527 at the 2000 census.

According to the 2010 Census, Banner Township is located at  (34.542120, -92.293420).

References

External links 

Townships in Arkansas
Populated places in Saline County, Arkansas